The 2016 season is Östersund' 1st season in the top flight of Swedish football and 19th year in existence as a football club. They entered this season as a newly promoted side after finishing second in the 2015 Superettan, and will participate in the Svenska Cupen. The season covers the period from 1 January 2016 to 1 November 2016.

Club

Coaching staff

{|class="wikitable"
|-
!Position
!Staff
|-
|Director of Football|| Daniel Kindberg
|-
|Head coach|| Graham Potter
|-
|Assistant coach|| Billy Reid
|-
|Assistant coach|| Björn Hamberg
|-
|Goalkeeper coach|| Linus Eriksson
|-
|Senior Opposition Scout|| Kyle Macaulay
|-
|Physiotherapist|| Frida Eklund
|-
|Physiotherapist|| Jenny Larsson
|-
|Pilates Instructor|| Rachel Potter
|-
|International Head Coach|| Bengt Olsson
|-

Squad information

First-team squad

Transfers

In

Winter

Out

Winter

Loan in

Winter

Loan out

Winter

Overall transfer activity

Spending
Winter:  £56,000

Summer:  £0

Total:  £56,000

Income
Winter:  £0

Summer:  £0

Total:  £0

Expenditure
Winter:  £56,000

Summer:  £0

Total:  £56,000

Friendlies

Competitions

Overview

{| class="wikitable" style="text-align: center"
|-
!rowspan=2|Competition
!colspan=8|Record
|-
!
!
!
!
!
!
!
!
|-
| Allsvenskan

|-
| Svenska Cupen

|-
! Total

Allsvenskan

League table

Results summary

Results by matchday

Score overview

Matches

Svenska Cupen

Statistics

Appearances

Top scorers
The list is sorted by shirt number when total goals are equal.

Clean sheets
The list is sorted by shirt number when total appearances are equal.

Summary

Awards

Player

References

Östersunds FK seasons
Östersunds FK